Esashi may refer to:

Places in Japan
Esashi, Iwate, previously a city, now a ward in Ōshū city, Iwate Prefecture
Esashi District, Hokkaidō, a district in Sōya Subprefecture, Hokkaidō
Esashi, Hokkaidō (Hiyama), the capital town of Hiyama Subprefecture, Hokkaidō
Esashi, Hokkaidō (Sōya), a town in Esashi District, Sōya Subprefecture, Hokkaidō

People with the surname
Masayoshi Esashi, Japanese engineer

Japanese-language surnames